Set Me Free in a 1924 German silent film directed by Erich Eriksen and starring Grete Reinwald, Carl Auen, and Anna von Palen.

The film's sets were designed by the art director Max Frick.

Cast

References

Bibliography
 Gerhard Lamprecht. Deutsche Stummfilme, Volume 8.

External links

1924 films
Films of the Weimar Republic
German silent feature films
Films directed by Erich Eriksen
German black-and-white films
National Film films
1920s German films